Asdee or Astee ( meaning the "black waterfall") is a small village in County Kerry, Ireland.

History 

Settlement in the village dates back to at least the mid-11th century, while the ringforts, located close to the bridge at the bottom of the village, were built between 600AD and 900AD.

At the turn of the 12th century, the O'Connors, Kings of Kerry, moved from their Doon Point (Ballybunion) stronghold to Clár an Easa Duibhe (meaning "The Plain of the Black Waterfall"), where the village is now situated. This move was carried out to facilitate an alliance between the O'Connors and the O'Briens, who were Kings of Thomond and the descendants of Brian Boru, the last High King of Ireland. The calmer waters around Clár an Easa Duibhe allowed the O'Connors a safer passage across to the O'Brien stronghold of what is now County Clare. 

By 1146, the O'Connor's had built a castle in the area to consolidate their power and the area's name was changed to Caisleán Easa Duibhe, meaning "Castle of the Black Waterfall". Three kingships ruled from Caisleán Easa Duibhe, before the O'Connors moved to Carrigafoyle Castle as the result of a marriage arrangement at the end of the 12th century. The castle in Caisleán Easa Duibhe fell into disrepair over the years, with some of the stone from the castle eventually being used in the building of the three bungalows beside the church in the village.

The black waterfall, from where the village gets its name, was quarried by the British prior to the mid-18th century, leaving a smaller version of the original waterfall remaining a short distance upstream of the village.

Jesse James 
The village is known for its association with Jesse James, whose ancestor, John, lived in Asdee, having moved from the United Kingdom, before migrating to the United States in the mid-17th century. Jesse James was born in Kearney, Missouri in 1847, going on to become one of the most famous outlaws in the American Wild West.

Amenities

Beach
Littor Strand is a Green Flag beach which stretches for miles along the estuary into the adjoining Beale Beach. The nearby estuary is home to Bottlenose Dolphins and migrant waders and Brent Geese. The beach also plays host to several resident species of birdlife, including Oystercatchers, Curlews, Dunlins, and various types of Seagull.

Shannon Way Trail 

The Shannon Way Walking Trail gives views of the Shannon Estuary. Stretching from Cnoc an Óir to Tarbert, the trail gives views of North Kerry, Clare, Limerick, and as far as Galway on a clear day.

Built heritage

"The Buildings" 
Tullahinell House, known as "The Buildings", was the former landlord's residence of Maxwell V. Blacker-Douglas. During the Great Famine (1845-1849), Douglas provided employment on his farm for many in the area.

There was also a mill located here in the late-1800s, the stream for which no longer exists, having originally been artificially diverted to the Buildings.

In the early 1900s, "The Buildings" was at times used as a refuge for Republicans fleeing British authorities. It also played host to a meeting of senior Republican figures, including Cathal Brugha and Arthur Griffith, during the Irish War of Independence.

Church 
The church in the village was built in 1835 and paid for by the Hickie family for the people of Asdee. The church was extended and renovated in 1964.

The Hickies came from Clare, where they had been chiefs and hereditary physicians to the Kings of Munster, before having their lands confiscated and given to Cromwellian settlers in the 1650s. After moving to the area, the family built Kilelton House, between Asdee and Ballylongford. For nearly three centuries, the family were benefactors to these two villages. Until the inception of the National Education Act, the family had been managers of the boys and girls schools in Asdee.

St Eoin's well 
St Eoin's Well, located near the village, hosts an annual mass every June. This holy well was traditionally believed to have healing properties.

See also
List of towns and villages in the Republic of Ireland

References

External links 
 AsdeeVillage.com

Towns and villages in County Kerry